Alfred Alexander Julius (4 September 1812 – 1865) was an English rower who was a three times winner of the Wingfield Sculls, the amateur sculling championship of the River Thames.

Julius was born at Richmond on Thames, the son of George Charles Julius and Isabella Maria Gilder. His father was from Nichola Town, St Kitts, West Indies.

Julius challenged the Wingfield Sculls champion Charles Lewis in 1832 and won the race. Lewis won the championship back in 1833. But Julius was then so preeminent that he put off challengers in 1834 and 1835 and won with row-overs. 

Julius died in the Richmond district at the age of 43.

Julius married Eliza Alexander, daughter of Major General James Alexander of the East India Company, in 1844 at St Marylebone. Their daughter Ada married Sir Charles Layard, the Government Agent of the Western province of Ceylon.

References

1812 births
1865 deaths
English male rowers
British male rowers